is a Japanese judoka.

She won the gold medal in the Half-middleweight (63 kg) division at the 2009 World Judo Championships and in 2010, in 2011 she lost the final to local hero Gévrise Émane.

Her elder sister is Masae Ueno, who retired in 2009 after winning gold at the 2004 and 2008 Olympics.
In Summer Olympics 2012, Yoshie Ueno lost in the quarter-finals to South Korean eighth seed Joung Da-Woon.

References

External links

 
 
 

Japanese female judoka
1983 births
Living people
Asian Games medalists in judo
Judoka at the 2012 Summer Olympics
Olympic medalists in judo
Olympic judoka of Japan
Olympic bronze medalists for Japan
Medalists at the 2012 Summer Olympics
Judoka at the 2010 Asian Games
Asian Games gold medalists for Japan
Medalists at the 2010 Asian Games
21st-century Japanese women